The Tibet–Ladakh–Mughal War of 1679–1684 was fought between the Central Tibetan Ganden Phodrang government, with the assistance of Mongol khanates, and the Namgyal dynasty of Ladakh with assistance from the Mughal Empire in Kashmir.

Background 
In the late 17th century, Ladakh sided with Bhutan in its dispute with Tibet. The Tibetans decided to punish Ladakh for interfering in their relations with Bhutan and the oppression of Gelug monasteries in Ladakh.

War 
In 1679 the 5th Dalai Lama appointed the lama of the Tashilhunpo Monastery, the Koshut Golden Chhewang, as the commander of the Tibeto-Mongol expedition to Ladakh.
He is said to have done so against the advice of his prime minister not to send the expedition.
Galdan Chhewang first secured his flanks when he made a treaty with Raja Kehri Singh of Bashahr, granting him trade rights with Tibet.

Galdan Chhewang's first campaign resulted in the defeat of the Ladakhi army led by Shakya Gyatso (at Khan-dMar. The following year he defeated the Ladakhis again at Chang La (Byan-la) and occupied the country with the exception of the fortresses of Basgo, and Tinggmosgang, which held out against the Tibetan attacks for the next three years.

The stalemate was broken with the Mughal Empire's intervention in the war. Kashmir was a Mughal province at this time and included Ladakh in its sphere of influence. In 1683 an army led by Fidai Khan, son of governor Ibrahim Khan of Kashmir, defeated the Tibeto-Mongol army and lifted the siege of Basgo, continuing the pursuit until Lake Pangong. The Kashmiris helped restore Ladakhi rule on the condition that a mosque be built in Leh and that the Ladakhi king convert to Islam. The Mughals retreated after signing a treaty with the Ladakhis. Kashmiri historians assert that, after this, the Ladakhi king converted to Islam in return. However, the Ladakhi chronicles do not mention such a thing and the Ladakhi people refute it. The king agreed to give tribute to the Mughals in return for their help. 

Johan Eleverskog writes that in his struggle for power over Tibet, the Fifth Dalai Lama employed fear and violence over the Tibetan territories.

Treaty of Tingmosgang 

In 1684, the Ganden Phodrang Prime Minister Desi Sangye Gyatso and the King Delek Namgyal of Ladakh signed the 1684 Treaty of Tingmosgang to end the war.
According to the Ladakh Chronicles, the treaty fixed the Tibet-Ladakh border at the Lhari stream near Demchok, and regulated trade and tribute missions between Ladakh to Tibet.

Notes

References
 
 
 
 

Conflicts in 1679
1680s conflicts
History of Ladakh
Wars involving Tibet
Wars involving the Mughal Empire
1679 in the Mughal Empire
1680s in the Mughal Empire